Tanu Grewal is a Canadian actress of Indian origin who made her debut in the Punjabi-language comedy film Shava Ni Girdhari Lal as Kuljeet. She also played the lead role in Punjabi film Yaar Mera Titliaan Warga and music video Chitta Kurta.

Early life and career
Tanu was born on January 27, 2001, in Vancouver, British Columbia, Canada to immigrant parents from Punjab. She attended David Thompson Secondary School from where she obtained her High School Diploma. She started her career through Punjabi music videos such as Chitta Kurta, Chithiyan, Rim vs Jhanjar, Lifestyle by Amrit Mann, Punjaban by Rajvir Jawanda and Laut Aana by Karan Aujla. She made her debut as an actress in the film Shava Ni Girdhari Lal from which she won the best debut actress award by PTC Punjabi and in 2022 she played the lead role in Yaar Mera Titliaan Warga.

Filmography

Actor

Awards

References

2001 births
Living people
Actresses in Punjabi cinema